Grabos may refer to:
Grabos I, an Illyrian king who ruled in the 5th century BC
Grabos II, an Illyrian king who ruled in the 4th century BC